KALS may refer to:

 KALS (FM) radio station, Kalispell, Montana, US
 San Luis Valley Regional Airport, Alamosa, Colorado, US, ICAO code